Keseh is a village in Khamir Rural District, in the Central District of Khamir County, Hormozgan Province, Iran. At the 2006 census, its population was 660, in 153 families.

References 

Populated places in Khamir County